Liu Chieh (27 May 1907 – 12 February 1991) was a diplomat of the Republic of China. He represented China at the United Nations from 1962 to 1971, and was the last Permanent Representative of the Republic of China to the UN.

Liu studied at Oxford University and practiced as a barrister in China. He was an advisor to the Chinese delegation at the meetings that established the League of Nations. In 1931, Liu officially joined China's diplomatic corps; he served as first secretary in the Chinese Embassy in London and as minister plenipotentiary in Washington, D.C. He later became China's deputy foreign minister in 1945 and at various times served as ambassador to Canada and the Philippines. Liu was the Chinese delegate to the Dumbarton Oaks Conference in 1944 and to the 1945 conference in San Francisco that resulted in the founding of the United Nations. Later, the Chinese government appointed him as the government's representative on the United Nations Trusteeship Council.

After the Communists seized power in 1949 and proclaimed the People's Republic of China, Liu joined the Republic of China's government on Taiwan. In 1962, Liu became the Permanent Representative of the Republic of China at the UN, where he served as the President of the Security Council numerous times. Liu was China's representative at the UN when the General Assembly voted in Resolution 2758 to transfer China's UN seat to the Communist People's Republic; Liu led a walk-out protest at the General Assembly just prior to the vote.

On 10 March 1972, Liu was appointed as the Ambassador of the Republic of China to the Republic of the Philippines. He submitted to the National Book on 23 March 1972. He left on 6 June, 1975.

Liu died of a cerebral hemorrhage at his home in San Francisco, where he had been living in retirement.

References
 Alfonso A. Narvaez, "Liu Chieh, Taiwan's Top Delegate At U.N. in 1960's, Is Dead at 85", New York Times, 1991-02-15

Permanent Representatives of the Republic of China to the United Nations
Ambassadors of China to the United States
Ambassadors of the Republic of China to Canada
Ambassadors of the Republic of China to the Philippines
Alumni of the University of Oxford
Senior Advisors to President Lee Teng-hui
1907 births
1991 deaths
People from Zhongshan
Taiwanese people from Guangdong
Chinese expatriates in the United Kingdom